Corkish is a surname of Manx origin. Notable people with the surname include:

 Geoff Corkish (born 1953), British politician
 Jamie Lynn Corkish (born 1984), American sport shooter

See also
 Corkish Apartments,Portland, Oregon, United States

Manx-language surnames